The pale-headed brushfinch (Atlapetes pallidiceps) is a species of bird in the family Passerellidae.

It is threatened by habitat loss and the nest-parasitic shiny cowbird. Most of its tiny known range, estimated at only 1 km2 by BirdLife International, is within the Yunguilla reserve, which, following the rediscovery of this species in 1998, was set up by the Jocotoco Foundation. Following intensive management, including the removal of cowbirds, the population of the pale-headed brushfinch is currently increasing. Further increase, however, may be limited by a lack of suitable habitat.

References

 Oppel, S., Schaefer, H., Schmidt, V., and Schröderm B. (2004). Cowbird parasitism of Pale-headed Brush Finch Atlapetes pallidiceps: implications for conservation and management. Bird Conservation International 14: 63–75.
 Agreda, A., Krabbe, N. & Rodríguez, O. (1999). Pale-headed Brush Finch Atlapetes pallidiceps is not extinct. Cotinga 11: 50–54.

External links
BirdLife International species factsheet

pale-headed brush finch
Birds of the Ecuadorian Andes
Endemic birds of Ecuador
pale-headed brush finch
Taxonomy articles created by Polbot